Muḥarram (fully known as Muharram ul Haram) is the first month of the Islamic calendar. It is one of the four sacred months of the year when warfare is forbidden. It is held to be the second holiest month after Ramadan.

The tenth day of Muharram is known as Ashura. Better known as part of the Mourning of Muharram, Shi'a Muslims mourn the tragedy of Ḥusayn ibn Alī's family.

Shiites mourn the martyrdom of Ḥusayn by abstaining from joyous events. Instead, Shia Muslims hold many events to offer condolences to Imam Husayn and to honor the martyrs by prayer, reading supplications, and holding charity events. Shiʿi Muslims eat as little as possible on the Ashura; however, this is not seen as fasting. Alevis fast ten or twelve days, each day for one of the Twelve Imams of Shiʿa Islam, to commemorate and mourn the Imams, as if a very close relative has died. Some (excluding children, elderly or sick) do not eat or drink, avoid entertainment until zawal (afternoon) as a part of their mourning for Husayn. In addition, there is an important ziyarat book, the Ziyarat Ashura about Ḥusayn. In Shiʿism, it is popular to read this ziyarat on this date.

Muharram and Ashura
The word Muharram means forbidden or prohibited. Before Islam, it is said that this month was called as Safer ul Awwal.
The sighting of the new moon ushers in the Islamic New Year. The first month, Muharram, is one of the four sacred months mentioned in the Quran (although not mentioned by name), along with the seventh month of Rajab, and the eleventh and twelfth months of Dhu al-Qi'dah and Dhu al-Hijjah, respectively, immediately preceding Muharram. During these sacred months, warfare is forbidden. Before the advent of Islam, the Quraish and Arabs also forbade warfare during those months. Before Islam, the Arabs also fasted on the tenth day of Muharram. This day also had importance in other Semitic religions like Judaism and Christianity. Muhammad also fasted many times on this day before his prophethood and after his migration to Medina and also ordered the Muslims to fast on this day and ninth and eleventh day as well. But the fasting was optional after Ramadan fasting was made obiligatory. It is narrated by Abu Hurairah that the Prophet Muhammad said, "The most virtuous fasting after the month of Ramadan is (in) Allah's month Al-Muharram."

Muharram and Ashura to the Muslims

Ashura, which literally means the "Tenth" in Arabic, refers to the tenth day of Muharram.

According to Sunni Muslims, fasting on Ashura, the tenth day of the Islamic month of Muharram was a practice established by Muhammad in the early days of Islam that commemorates the parting of the Red Sea by Moses.

While in Shia Islam, Muharram is a month of remembrance. Ashura is well known in Shia tradition because of its historical significance and mourning for the Shahadat (martyrdom) of Ḥusayn ibn Ali, the grandson of Muhammad. Shia Muslims begin mourning from the first night of Muharram and continue for ten nights, climaxing on the 10th of Muharram, known as the Day of Ashura. The last few days up until and including the Day of Ashura are the most important because these were the days in which Hussain and his family and followers (including women, children and elderly people) were deprived of water from the 7th onward and on the 10th, Husayn and 72 of his followers were killed by the army of Yazid I at the Battle of Karbala on Yazid's orders. The surviving members of Husayn's family and those of his followers were taken captive, marched to Damascus, and imprisoned there.

Timing for Muharram

The Islamic calendar is a lunar calendar, and months begin when the first crescent of a new moon is sighted. Since the Islamic lunar calendar year is 11 to 12 days shorter than the solar year, Muharram migrates throughout the solar years. The estimated start and end dates for Muharram are as follows (based on the Umm al-Qura calendar of Saudi Arabia):

Incidents that occurred during this month

 1 Muharram: Seizure of the Grand Mosque in 1400 AH (1979 AD).
 3 Muharram: Husayn ibn Ali enters Karbala and establishes camp. Yazid's forces are present. 61 AH (680 AD).
 5 Muharram: Death anniversary (urs) of Baba Farid, a Punjabi Sufi saint, in 665 AH (1266 AD). His urs is celebrated for six days during Muharram, in Pakpattan, Pakistan.
 7 Muharram: Access to water was banned to Husayn ibn Ali by Yazid's orders. 61 AH (680 AD).
 8 Muharram: Referred to as the Muharram Rebellion, the day on which Bengali Muslims in Sylhet lead one of the earliest anti-British uprisings in the subcontinent. 1197 AH (1782 AD).
 10 Muharram: Referred to as the Day of Ashurah (lit. "the Tenth"), the day on which Husayn ibn Ali was martyred in the Battle of Karbala.  Shia Muslims spend the day in mourning, while Sunni Muslims fast on this day, commemorating the rescue of the Israelites by Musa (Moses) from Pharaoh. Shia Muslims also mourn for the martyrs of Karbala. Many Sufi Muslims fast for the same reason as the Sunnis mentioned above, but also for the martyred dead in Karbala.
 15 Muharram: Birth of Muhammad Sirajuddin Naqshbandi in 1297 AH (1879 AD).
 25 Muharram: Zayn al-‘Ābidīn, fourth Shia Imam was martyred by Marvanian in 95 AH (714 AD).
 28 Muharram: Death anniversary (urs) of Ashraf Jahangir Semnani, an Indian Sufi saint, in 808 AH (1405 AD).

See also 
 Islamic Calendar
 Day of Ashura
 Mourning of Muharram
 Day of Tasu'a
 Hosay
 Rawda Khwani

References

Further reading

 Chelkowski, Peter J. ed. (1979). Ta’ziyeh: Ritual and Drama in Iran. New York: New York University Press.
 Cole, Juan (1988). Roots of North Indian Shiism in Iran and Iraq: Religion and State in Avadh, 1722–1859. Berkeley, CA: University of California Press.
 Kartomi, Margaret (1986). "Tabut – a Shia Ritual Transplanted from India to Sumatra",  in Nineteenth and Twentieth Century Indonesia: Essays in Honour of Professor J.D. Legge, edited by David P. Chandler and M.C. Ricklefs, Australia: Monash University, Centre for Southeast Asian Studies, 141–62.
 Mason, P.H. (2016) "Fight-dancing and the Festival: Tabuik in Pariaman, Indonesia, and Iemanjá" in Salvador da Bahia, Brazil. Martial Arts Studies Journal, 2, 71–90. 
 Pinault, David (1992). The Shiites: Ritual and Popular Piety in a Muslim Community. London: I.B. Tauris.

External links
 Commemoration of Muharram is permissible
 Optional prayers for Muharram, especially Qalbi Zikr 
 Muharram Quotes and Wishes
 Matam (beating the chest) in Muharram
 
 A day of mourning for Shiites
 Muharram in West Sumatra
 What is Muharram ?

1
Islamic terminology
Public holidays in Indonesia
Public holidays in Malaysia
Shia Islam
Hussainiya